Isabel Withers (January 20, 1896 – September 3, 1968) was an American actress, who worked in theatre, film, and television.

Early life
Withers was born in Frankton, Indiana, a small town just outside of Anderson, Indiana. In her youth, Withers lived in Coffeyville, Kansas, and Illinois.

Career

Theater

She attended school in Kansas City, Missouri, and later enrolled in a school of drama there, and joining a Chautauqua circuit repertoire company. At the time it was playing in Billings, Montana, performing The Melting Pot, a play by Israel Zangwill. Following a route of tented colleges, Withers first appeared on the road in Little Women. She played the leading role in The Tailor Made Man after a season in stock theatre in Utica, New York. She performed in Cappy Ricks in Chicago.

George M. Cohan selected Withers for the lead feminine role, with Lowell Sherman, in the Chicago company of The Tavern. In New York City she appeared in Kempy at the Belmont Theater. While in New York Withers modeled for an exclusive gown shop during the day. Henry Duffy wired her to come to San Francisco, California, to do Kempy just as she was on her way to visit her mother in Los Angeles. She made her way south acting in Love Em and Leave 'Em and Rain. Withers starred in Rain at the old Orpheum Theater, 12th Street, San Francisco, in November 1926. Drawing comparisons to actress Jeanne Eagels, she drew praise in the role of Sadie Thompson.

Movies and television
Withers accumulated ninety-two screen and television credits, beginning with a role in the movie The Hot Spot (1931). Many of her screen appearances were uncredited parts. She was also in her share of B-movies. Two memorable movies in which she had uncredited parts were The Babe Ruth Story (1948) and Monkey Business (1952).

She performed on television during the 1950s in such shows as Four Star Playhouse (1955), Lassie (1956), The Millionaire (1957), and
The Bob Cummings Show (1958).

Isabel Withers died in 1968 in Hollywood, California, aged 72.

Partial filmography
 Women Won't Tell (1932)
 Brother Rat (1938)
 Henry and Dizzy (1942)
 Behind Prison Walls (1943)
 Law Men (1944)
 I Love a Mystery (1945)
 The Missing Corpse (1945)
 A Sporting Chance (1945)
 The Gay Senorita (1945)
 Girls of the Big House (1945)
 The Undercover Woman (1946)
 Air Hostess (1949)
 Perfect Strangers (1950)
 Beware of Blondie (1950)
 A Wonderful Life (1951)

Sources
New York Times, Who's Who, October 5, 1924, p. X2.
New York Times, Week Promises Brilliant New Offerings In Theaters, May 22, 1927, p. 17.
Oakland Tribune, Rain Billed For 12th Street Theater, Sunday, November 14, 1926, p. 2W.

References

External links

 

1896 births
1968 deaths
20th-century American actresses
Actresses from Indiana
American film actresses
American silent film actresses
American stage actresses
American television actresses
People from Coffeyville, Kansas
People from Madison County, Indiana